The women's lightweight (56 kg/123.2 lbs) Low-Kick division at the W.A.K.O. European Championships 2004 in Budva was the third lightest of the female Low-Kick tournaments and involved only three fighters.  Each of the matches was three rounds of two minutes each and were fought under Low-Kick kickboxing rules.

As there were not enough participants for a tournament designed for four, one of the contestants received a bye through to the final.  The tournament gold medallist was Italy's Barbara Plazzoli who added to the silver medal she won in Full-Contact at the last world championships in Paris, by defeating Serbia and Montenegro's Goranka Blagojevic by majority decision.  The tournaments last fighter, Tereze Lindberg from Sweden, won bronze.

Results

Key

See also
List of WAKO Amateur European Championships
List of WAKO Amateur World Championships
List of female kickboxers

References

External links
 WAKO World Association of Kickboxing Organizations Official Site

W.A.K.O. European Championships 2004 (Budva)